Alessandro Calcaterra (born 26 May 1975 in Civitavecchia) is an Italian water polo player, who represented his native country at three consecutive Summer Olympics, starting in 1996 (Atlanta, Georgia). He was a member of the men's national team that claimed the bronze medal in 1996. He was the top goalscorer at the 2008 Olympics, with 27 goals.

See also
 Italy men's Olympic water polo team records and statistics
 List of Olympic medalists in water polo (men)
 List of players who have appeared in multiple men's Olympic water polo tournaments
 List of men's Olympic water polo tournament top goalscorers
 List of World Aquatics Championships medalists in water polo

References

External links
 
 

1975 births
Living people
People from Civitavecchia
Italian male water polo players
Water polo players at the 1996 Summer Olympics
Water polo players at the 2000 Summer Olympics
Water polo players at the 2004 Summer Olympics
Water polo players at the 2008 Summer Olympics
Olympic water polo players of Italy
Olympic bronze medalists for Italy
Olympic medalists in water polo
World Aquatics Championships medalists in water polo
Medalists at the 1996 Summer Olympics
Mediterranean Games silver medalists for Italy
Competitors at the 2005 Mediterranean Games
Mediterranean Games medalists in water polo
Sportspeople from the Metropolitan City of Rome Capital